The synthesis of precious metals involves the use of either nuclear reactors or particle accelerators to produce these elements.

Precious metals occurring as fission products

Ruthenium, rhodium

Ruthenium and rhodium are precious metals produced as a small percentage of the fission products from the nuclear fission of uranium. The longest half-lives of the radioisotopes of these elements generated by nuclear fission are 373.59 days for ruthenium and 45 days for rhodium. This makes the extraction of the non-radioactive isotope from spent nuclear fuel possible after a few years of storage, although the extract must be checked for radioactivity from trace quantities of other elements before use.

Ruthenium

Each kilogram of the fission products of 235U will contain 63.44 grams of ruthenium isotopes with halflives longer than a day. Since a typical used nuclear fuel contains about 3% fission products, one ton of used fuel will contain about 1.9 kg of ruthenium. The 103Ru and 106Ru will render the fission ruthenium very radioactive.  If the fission occurs in an instant then the ruthenium thus formed will have an activity due to 103Ru of 109 TBq g−1 and 106Ru of 1.52 TBq g−1. 103Ru has a half-life of about 39 days meaning that within 390 days it will have effectively decayed to the only stable isotope of rhodium, 103Rh, well before any reprocessing is likely to occur. 106Ru has a half-life of about 373 days, meaning that if the fuel is left to cool for 5 years before reprocessing only about 3% of the original quantity will remain; the rest will have decayed. To put the values in the table into perspective, the activity in natural potassium (due to naturally occurring ) is about 30 Bq per gram.

Rhodium

It is possible to extract rhodium from used nuclear fuel: 1 kg of fission products of 235U contains 13.3 grams of 103Rh.  At 3% fission products by weight, one ton of used fuel will contain about 400 grams of rhodium. The longest lived radioisotope of rhodium is 102mRh with a half-life of 2.9 years, while the ground state (102Rh) has a half-life of 207 days.

Each kilogram of fission rhodium will contain 6.62 ng of 102Rh and 3.68 ng of 102mRh. As 102Rh decays by beta decay to either 102Ru (80%) (some positron emission will occur) or 102Pd (20%) (some gamma ray photons with about 500 keV are generated) and the excited state decays by beta decay (electron capture) to 102Ru (some gamma ray photons with about 1 MeV are generated). If the fission occurs in an instant then 13.3 grams of rhodium will contain 67.1 MBq (1.81 mCi) of 102Rh and 10.8 MBq (291 μCi) of 102mRh. As it is normal to allow used nuclear fuel to stand for about five years before reprocessing, much of this activity will decay away leaving 4.7 MBq of 102Rh and 5.0 MBq of 102mRh. If the rhodium metal was then left for 20 years after fission, the 13.3 grams of rhodium metal would contain 1.3 kBq of 102Rh and 500 kBq of 102mRh. Rhodium has the highest price of these precious metals ($440,000/kg in 2022), but the cost of the separation of the rhodium from the other metals needs to be considered, although recent high prices may create opportunity for consideration.

Palladium
Palladium is also produced by nuclear fission in small percentages, amounting to 1 kg per ton of spent fuel. As opposed to rhodium and ruthenium, palladium has a radioactive isotope, 107Pd, with a very long half-life (6.5 million years), so palladium produced in this way has a very low specific activity. Mixed in with the other isotopes of palladium recovered from the spent fuel, this gives an activity of  Ci. Also, 107Pd has a very low decay energy of only 33 keV. But, in order to ensure safety, 107Pd could be converted to 108Pd, one stable isotope.

Silver
Silver is produced as result of nuclear fission in small amounts (approximately 0.1%). The vast majority of produced silver is Ag-109 which is stable, and Ag-111 which decays away very quickly to form Cd-111. The only radioactive isotopes with a significant half life produced are the metastable Ag-110m (249.8 d) and Ag-108m (418 years), the former of which is produced via neutron capture from Ag-109, and the latter of which is only formed in trace quantities. After a short period in storage the produced silver is almost entirely stable and safe to use. Because of the modest price of silver, extraction of silver alone from highly radioactive fission products would be uneconomical. When recovered with ruthenium, rhodium, and palladium (price of silver in 2011: about 880 €/kg; rhodium; and ruthenium: about 30,000 €/kg) the economics change substantially: silver becomes a byproduct of platinoid metal recovery from fission waste and the marginal cost of processing the byproduct could be competitive.

Precious metals produced via irradiation

Ruthenium
In addition to being a fission product of uranium, as described above, another way to produce ruthenium is to start with molybdenum, which has a price averaging between $10 and $20/kg, in contrast with ruthenium's $1860/kg. The isotope 100Mo, which has an abundance of 9.6% in natural molybdenum, can be transmuted to 101Mo by slow neutron irradiation. 101Mo and its daughter product, 101Tc, both have beta-decay half-lives of roughly 14 minutes. The end product is stable 101Ru. Alternately, it can be produced by the neutron inactivation of 99Tc; the resulting 100Tc has a half-life of 16 seconds and decays to the stable 100Ru. Given that Technetium-99 is among the most problematic long-lived fission products and - unlike its nuclear isomer  - has no known applications, production of Ruthenium from nuclear waste derived Technetium appears particularly promising. However, if Ruthenium that can be used without having to wait for nuclear decays to occur is desired, a particularly isotopically and chemically pure Technetium-99 target is needed. has important medical applications and the production of  waste from it is unavoidable.

Rhodium
In addition to being a fission product of uranium, as described above, another way to produce rhodium is to start with ruthenium, which has a price of $1860/kg, which is much lower than rhodium's $765,188/kg. The isotope 102Ru, which forms 31.6% of natural ruthenium, can be transmuted to 103Ru by slow neutron irradiation. 103Ru then decays to 103Rh via beta decay, with a half-life of 39.26 days.  The isotopes 98Ru through 101Ru, which together form 44.2% of natural ruthenium, could also be transmuted into 102Ru, and subsequently to 103Ru and then 103Rh, through multiple neutron captures in a nuclear reactor. As Ruthenium can also be produced from lower value feedstocks such as Technetium or Molybdenum (as described above) it might be possible to produce very high value Rhodium via successive neutron capture (and beta decays) from low value molybdenum or even "waste" Technetium.

Rhenium

The cost of rhenium as of January 2010 was $6,250/kg; by contrast, tungsten is very cheap, with a price of under $30/kg as of July 2010. The isotopes 184W and 186W together make up roughly 59% of naturally-occurring tungsten. Slow-neutron irradiation could convert these isotopes into 185W and 187W, which have half-lives of 75 days and 24 hours, respectively, and always undergo beta decay to the corresponding rhenium isotopes.  These isotopes could then be further irradiated to transmute them into osmium (see below), increasing their value further.  Also, 182W and 183W, which together form 40.8% of naturally-occurring tungsten, can, via multiple neutron captures in a nuclear reactor, be transmuted into 184W, which can then be transmuted into rhenium.

Osmium

The cost of osmium as of January 2010 was $12,217 per kilogram, making it roughly twice the price of rhenium, which is worth $6,250/kg. Rhenium has two naturally occurring isotopes, 185Re and 187Re. Irradiation by slow neutrons would transmute these isotopes into 186Re and 188Re, which have half-lives of 3 days and 17 hours, respectively. The predominant decay pathway for both of these isotopes is beta-minus decay into 186Os and 188Os.

Iridium

The cost of iridium as of January 2010 was $13,117/kg, somewhat higher than that of osmium ($12,217/kg). The isotopes 190Os and 192Os together make up roughly 67% of naturally-occurring osmium. Slow-neutron irradiation could convert these isotopes into 191Os and 193Os, which have half-lives of 15.4 and 30.11 days, respectively, and always undergo beta decay to 191Ir and 193Ir, respectively.  Also, 186Os through 189Os could be transmuted into 190Os through multiple neutron captures in a nuclear reactor, and subsequently into iridium.  These isotopes could then be further irradiated to transmute them into platinum (see below), increasing their value further.

Platinum

The cost of platinum as of October 2014 was $39,900 per kilogram, making it equally as expensive as rhodium. Iridium, by contrast, has only about half the value of platinum ($18,000/kg). Iridium has two naturally occurring isotopes, 191Ir and 193Ir. Irradiation by slow neutrons would transmute these isotopes into  192Ir and 194Ir, with short half-lives of 73 days and 19 hours, respectively; the predominant decay pathway for both of these isotopes is beta-minus decay into 192Pt and 194Pt.

Gold
Chrysopoeia, the artificial production of gold, is the symbolic goal of alchemy. Such transmutation is possible in particle accelerators or nuclear reactors, although the production cost is currently many times the market price of gold. Since there is only one stable gold isotope, 197Au, nuclear reactions must create this isotope in order to produce usable gold.

Gold synthesis in an accelerator
Gold synthesis in a particle accelerator is possible in many ways. The Spallation Neutron Source has a liquid mercury target which will be transmuted into gold, platinum, and iridium, which are lower in atomic number than mercury.

Gold synthesis in a nuclear reactor
Gold was synthesized from mercury by neutron bombardment in 1941, but the isotopes of gold produced were all radioactive. In 1924, a German scientist, Adolf Miethe, accomplished the same feat.

In 1980, Glenn Seaborg transmuted several thousand atoms of bismuth into gold at the Lawrence Berkeley Laboratory. His experimental technique was able to remove protons and neutrons from the bismuth atoms. Seaborg's technique was far too expensive to enable the routine manufacture of gold but his work is the closest yet to emulating an aspect of the mythical Philosopher's Stone.

See also
Nuclear transmutation
Precious metals

References

External links
Spallation Neutron Source
Mercury 197
Mercury 197 decays to Gold 197

Nuclear physics
Precious metals

de:Edelmetallsynthese